Isabel Carmelina Cruz Silva is a Mexican politician affiliated with the Institutional Revolutionary Party. As of 2014 she served as Deputy of the LIX Legislature of the Mexican Congress representing Oaxaca as replacement of Elpidio Concha.

References

Date of birth unknown
Living people
Politicians from Oaxaca
Women members of the Chamber of Deputies (Mexico)
Institutional Revolutionary Party politicians
Year of birth missing (living people)
21st-century Mexican politicians
21st-century Mexican women politicians
Deputies of the LIX Legislature of Mexico
Members of the Chamber of Deputies (Mexico) for Oaxaca